ドナドナ (Dona Dona) is the nineteenth album by the Japanese rock group Plastic Tree.

Track listing

Plastic Tree albums
Universal Music Japan albums
2009 albums